Free Society (1895–1897 as The Firebrand; 1897–1904 as Free Society) was a major anarchist newspaper in the United States at the end of the nineteenth and beginning of the twentieth centuries. Most anarchist publications in the US were in Yiddish, German, or Russian, but Free Society was published in English, permitting the dissemination of anarchist thought to English-speaking populations in the US.

The newspaper was established as The Firebrand in 1895 in Portland, Oregon by the Isaak family, Abraham Isaak, Mary Isaak, and their children, along with some associates; the organization served as "the headquarters of anarchist activity on the [West] Coast". The paper was particularly known for its advocacy of free love and women's rights, bringing an anarchist critique to bear on social and gender relations.

Deliberately defying the Comstock laws in an act of civil disobedience, The Firebrand published Walt Whitman's "A Woman Waits for Me" in 1897; A. J. Pope, Abe Isaak, and Henry Addis were quickly arrested and charged with publishing obscene information for the Whitman poem and a letter "It Depends on the Women", signed by A.E.K. The A.E.K. letter presented various hypotheticals of women refusing or assenting to sex with their husbands or lovers, and argued that true liberation required education of both sexes and particularly women.

After Isaak was released, the Isaak family moved the publication to San Francisco, California, and resumed publication under the name Free Society. However, while Free Society continued to discuss free love and advocate for equality of the sexes, it did not openly defy the Comstock laws again.

Notable contributors include
Kate Austin,
Voltairine de Cleyre,
Michael Cohn,
Jay Fox,
Emma Goldman,
Lizzie Holmes,
William Holmes,
C. L. James,
Harry Kelly,
James Ferdinand Morton Jr.,
and
Ross Winn.

See also
 List of anarchist periodicals
 Christian anarchism

Notes

References 
 Carolyn Ashbaugh, "Radical Women: The Haymarket Tradition", IN Haymarket Scrapbook, ed. by Dave Roediger and Franklin Rosemont, Chicago: Charles H. Kerr Publishing Co., 1986 (available at The Lucy Parsons Project) (discussing Free Society, including later imprisonment of Isaak family in 1901 after the McKinley assassination, and Jane Addams' efforts to secure their release)

 Emma Goldman, Living My Life (Vol. 1).
 Emma Goldman: Making Speech Free, 1902-1909, p. 551
 Elmer B. Isaak (Interview), IN Paul Avrich, Anarchist Voices: An Oral History of Anarchism in America (AK Press, 2006), pp. 27–28
 Maurice, Lori Klatt. "Stamping Out Indecency, The Postal Way" (aka "Stamping Out Indecency: Post Office Censorship"] (March 8, 2004, Evergreen State College)

External links

Anarchist periodicals published in the United States
Feminist newspapers
Free love advocates
Publications established in 1895
Anarcho-communism
Publications disestablished in 1904
Defunct newspapers published in Oregon
1895 establishments in Oregon
1904 disestablishments in Oregon